Adolfo Moran born in  Valladolid, Spain, architect and city planner 1975 doctor Ph.D.1989 University of Navarra, theoretical physicist and co-founder of World Physics Society.

He was professor of architecture at University of Valladolid, in which he was Projects I chairman and at the Faculty of Fine Arts of the University of Salamanca,full titular professor of Architectural Ideation Department, full professor of Architectural Imagination and City Imagination, and director of Permanent Seminar of  Housing Studies at Technical University of Madrid.

In 1992 his architectural work was selected as the principal ones by the Spanish Architecture Biennial. With Joaquin Moran, he received the award . Madrid 2010.

Books and scientific publications
The Reasonable Architecture or The Music of Space (La Arquitectura Razonable o La Música del Espacio) Adolfo Moran (1989 GAC edit.)
The Project of The City to Live (El Proyecto de la Ciudad para Vivir )Adolfo Moran (1992 Madrid City Hall edit.)
About the Method of Analysis and Architectural Production (Sobre el Método de Análisis y Producción Arquitectónica) Adolfo Moran (1991. Génova. Unione Italiana per el Disegno edit.)
The Modification of the Architecture (La Modificación de la Arquitectura) Adolfo Moran (1994. Madrid. EGA edit.)
Architecture and Nature (Arquitectura y Naturaleza) Adolfo Moran (1992. Valladolid. GRAPHEUS edit.)
The Light in the Project of Architecture according to Vitruvio, Alberti, Palladio and Boullée (La Luz en el Proyecto de Arquitectura según Vitrubio, Alberti, Palladio y Boullée) Adolfo Moran (1992. Roma. Gangemmi Editori edit.)
Principles of Architecture I (Principios de Arquitectura I) Adolfo Moran (1996. Pamplona. T6 Ediciones edit.)
Chronicle from Marinetti's Hangar (Crónica desde el Hangar de Marinetti) Adolfo Moran (1992. Buenos Aires. Marca de Agua edit.)
About Andrea Palladio's Method for the Construction of the Entasis (Sobre el Método de Andrea Palladio para la Realización del Entasis) Adolfo Moran (1992. Pamplona. Publicaciones Universidad de Navarra  edit.)
Towards a New Architecture. The American Challenge (Hacia una Nueva Arquitectura. El Desafío Americano. Adolfo Moran) (1992. Madrid. Taller de Editores edit.)
The Utopian City (La Ciudad Utópica) (1993. Buenos Aires. Marca de Agua edit.)
The Blurry Architectural Imagination (La Desdibujada Imaginación Arquitectónica) Adolfo Moran (2009. Madrid. C.EGA edit.)

Representative buildings and projects

Arch in Manhattan. New York City . U.S. ]
Palace of the President of Castile and Lion, Spain
Chamberí Neighborhood Remodeling. Madrid. Spain
 Lake Town Pueblo del Lago Punta del Este. Uruguay
Gare Routiere Town. Fes, Morocco
Foreign Brigade. Madrid, Spain
Control Buildings of Castile and Lion Headquarters, Spain
Social Club and Housings in Simancas, Spain
Transformation of the Esgueva River along Valladolid, Spain

References
http://www.saber.es/web/biblioteca/libros/desde-el-colegio-de-la-asuncion/html/t18.htm rehabilitación sede presidente Castilla y León
https://dialnet.unirioja.es/servlet/articulo?codigo=1995317 Hacia el Área de Imaginación Arquitectónica
https://dialnet.unirioja.es/servlet/articulo?codigo=4406544 Sobre la Imaginación Arquitectónica
https://dialnet.unirioja.es/servlet/libro?codigo=207457 La Arquitectura Razonable o la Música del Espacio
https://dialnet.unirioja.es/servlet/articulo?codigo=2979877 Museo MOPU Arquería Nuevos Ministerios
https://www.currentphysics.com/ World Physics Society´s Magazine

Recognitions
 The work of Adolfo Moran was rewarded by II Spanish Architecture Bienal(1993), as one of main Spanish architecture works
 First prize Award . Madrid 2010
 First prize Eivissa Building. Eivissa. Balearic Islands 2006
 First prize Commissioner Universal Exposition EXPO08. Zaragoza 2006

External links

  Police Headquarters 
Architectural Imagination. 
Famous Architects
Ibiza Building 

 New Central Zaragoza 
 Social Club in Simancas 
 Madrid Door 
   Castile and Lion President's Palace 
  Columns from  Castile and Lion President's Palace 
   Grand Arch in Grand Paris 
   The Bubbles of the Seine in Paris 
    Skyscrapers and Music Palace in Bilbao 
    Gran Via Award 1
   Gran Via Award 2
 Ibiza Building

1953 births
Living people
Spanish architects
University of Navarra alumni
Academic staff of the Technical University of Madrid
Academic staff of the University of Salamanca
Academic staff of the University of Valladolid